Canarium caudatum is a tree in the family Burseraceae. The specific epithet  is from the Latin meaning "tailed", referring to the tapering of the tree's leaflet.

Description
The bark is scaly and grey. The flowers are yellow-brown.

Distribution and habitat
Canarium caudatum grows naturally in Sumatra, Peninsular Malaysia and Borneo. Its habitat is lowland mixed dipterocarp and kerangas forests from sea-level to  altitude.

References

caudatum
Trees of Sumatra
Trees of Peninsular Malaysia
Trees of Borneo
Plants described in 1894